Plus was a German multinational discount supermarket chain founded in 1972. It operated 2,840 stores in Germany with an approximate 27,000 employees and about 1,200 stores in several other European countries. The retail model was to sell low-cost groceries with no expense incurred for display or marketing of products.  Groceries were stored in the shipping cartons they came in, rather than being stacked on shelves. In German advertising, the name "Plus" was used as a backronym for "Prima leben und sparen" (approximately "top-notch living and saving"), featuring animated "little prices" (also sold as plush puppets) as their mascot.

Sale
The Edeka Group and the Tengelmann Group entered a joint venture to acquire the Plus supermarket chain on November 16, 2007, which resulted in 70% of Plus supermarkets being owned by the Edeka Group and 30% owned by the Tengelmann Group.

As of January 2009, the stores in the Plus supermarket chain owned by the Edeka group were remodelled into Netto Marken-Discount supermarket chain branches, while the Tengelmann Group's supermarkets were bought by others.

In 2008, Plus was recognized by PETA as the most pet-friendly discount store.

References

External links
  (2021 link, now redirects netto-online.de)
  (2008 link, which was archived by the Wayback Machine)

1972 establishments in West Germany
Retail companies established in 1972
Defunct supermarkets of Germany
Defunct supermarkets of the United States
Mülheim
Retail companies disestablished in 2009
Supermarkets of Bulgaria
Supermarkets of Germany
Supermarkets of Poland
Defunct retail companies of Romania
Supermarkets of Spain
The Great Atlantic & Pacific Tea Company
Discount stores
German companies established in 1972
German companies disestablished in 2009